Águilas is a municipality in Spain.

Águilas may also refer to:

Águilas Blancas, a Mexican gridiron football team
Águilas CF, a defunct Spanish football team
Águilas Cibaeñas, a Dominican baseball team
Águilas de Mexicali, a Mexican baseball team
Aguilas de Tabasco, a Mexican football team
Águilas de la UPAEP, a Mexican football team
Águilas del Zulia, a Venezuelan baseball team
Águilas Doradas Rionegro, a Colombian football team
Águilas FC, a Spanish football team
Águilas UAGro, a Mexican football team